The Koenigsegg Agera is a mid-engine sports car produced by Swedish car manufacturer Koenigsegg. It is a successor to the CCX/CCXR. The name comes from the Swedish verb 'agera' which means "to act" or in imperative form "(You) act!".

It was named Hypercar of the Year in 2010 by Top Gear magazine.

The Agera ceased production in July 2018 with the unveiling of the two final edition cars at the 2018 Goodwood Festival of Speed. It was succeeded by the Jesko in 2019.

Specifications and performance

Engine and transmission

The total weight of the engine is only  due to a carbon fibre inlet manifold and aluminium construction. The transmission is a specially developed CIMA 7-speed dual-clutch with paddle shifters. It is the first dual-clutch transmission to feature only one input shaft. The second clutch slows down the input shaft during up shifts in order to reduce the time it takes to synchronise the next gear, resulting in faster shift times. Most notably, the transmission weighs only .

Performance (manufacturer claimed data)
  in 2.8 seconds
  in 8.0 seconds

The top speed for the production model is claimed to be .

Exterior and interior

The Agera has a body made from impregnated carbon fibre/kevlar with lightweight reinforcements. The car's hardtop roof is stowable under the front hood lid. The chassis is also made out of carbon fibre with an aluminium honeycomb structure that comes with integrated fuel tanks for optimal weight distribution and safety. The rear wing is electronically adjustable with auto setting or manual control in order to have as little compromise as possible between low drag and downforce, depending on driving conditions. Other notable features include the trademark "dihedral-synchro-helix-actuation" doors, a new traction control system, LED lighting, blue hood stripes that continue through the cockpit of the car and a custom interior with a new "Ghost light" lighting system, which uses carbon nanotubes in a unique configuration to shine through the car's aluminium buttons.

Models

Koenigsegg Agera R (2011–2014)

The Agera R made its debut at the March 2011 Geneva Motor Show with a Speed Racer livery, and special Michelin tyres. This adaptive rear wing system is lighter than conventional hydraulic/electrical adaptive systems, and has the unique ability to compensate for head/tailwind due to its spring-loaded design. Furthermore, the pylons holding the wing play not only a role in the Agera R's aerodynamic performance, but also assist in extracting hot air from the engine bay.

On 2 September 2011, during test sessions in Ängelholm, the Agera R broke six world land speed records for a production car, including  in 14.53 seconds, and 0–300–0 km/h in only 21.19 seconds. The braking performance required to maintain this record is enabled in part by the Agera's stability, demonstrated by Koenigsegg test driver and drivetrain technician Robert Serwanski, who was recorded by passenger Rob Ferretti (founder of the group "Super Speeders") braking from 300 km/h to 0 without holding the steering wheel.

The Agera R can produce lateral cornering forces of 1.60 G, due to a combination of mechanical balance and high levels of grip from the specially developed Michelin Supersport tyres.

The 2013 version of the Agera R premiered at the 2012 Geneva Motor Show. Koenigsegg's Flex Fuel Sensor technology allows the ECU to respond to varying fuel qualities and alcohol content by reducing power levels as a means of protecting the engine.

The Agera R was featured prominently in the Need for Speed franchise, prominently in Criterion Games' Need for Speed: Most Wanted (2012) and Ghost Games' Need for Speed Rivals (2013). Replicas of the Agera R were featured in the 2014 film Need for Speed. It is also featured in the 2013 mobile game Real Racing 3, Nitro Nation Drag & Drift (2014) and CSR Racing(2012)

Koenigsegg Agera S (2013–2014)

Koenigsegg presented the Agera S model in 2013. In 2013, one Agera S was the 100th Koenigsegg ever produced, celebrated by a specially-built car with gold leaf inlays named "Hundra" (Swedish for "one hundred").

On 10 June 2014, NAZA Swedish Motors launched the Agera S in Malaysia. It was the second Koenigsegg after the CCXR to arrive in the country, thus setting a new market for Koenigsegg. The Agera S is the only model offered in Malaysia due to the absence of E85 biofuel there.

Koenigsegg One:1 (2014–2015)

The Koenigsegg One:1 was presented at the 2014 Geneva Motor Show held in March. Koenigsegg built six cars apart from the car presented at the Geneva Motor Show, all of which were already sold. Koenigsegg took two cars to the 2014 Goodwood Festival of Speed, where they were displayed alongside other sports cars such as the McLaren P1, LaFerrari, the Porsche 918 Spyder and the Pagani Huayra.

The car is fitted with a variant of the same 5.0 L twin-turbocharged V8 engine used in the other Agera variants. The transmission is a 7-speed dual clutch paddle shift as used in other variants of the Agera.

The name One:1 comes from the power-to-weight ratio (1,360 PS to 1360 kg) giving the car 1 PS per 1 kg mass. The 1,360 PS power output is the equivalent of one megawatt, which Koenigsegg claims make the One:1 the 'world's first megacar'. The car is track-focused as opposed to the previous cars made by Koenigsegg, leading to changes such as limited boot space.

Koenigsegg Agera RS (2015–2018)

The Agera RS was unveiled at the 2015 Geneva Motor Show, along with the prototype version of the Regera. The Agera RS is an advanced version of the Agera R, implementing some of the new technology and features of the One:1 and combining the features of the Agera R and the Agera S. Koenigsegg billed it as "the ultimate track tool" due to its lightweight features and track optimised technologies. The Agera RS produces 450 kg of downforce at 250 km/h. The model was initially going to be limited to 25 units, however two extra cars were built, one being the factory development car and one as a replacement for a customer car damaged while it was being used for shakedown testing (Agera RS Phoenix built after the crash of Agera RS Gryphon). Each Agera RS could be fully customised by its owner.

The last Agera RS rolled off the production line on 4 April 2018.

Koenigsegg Agera Final Edition (2016–2018)

At the 2016 Geneva Motor Show, a final three-car series of the Agera was announced as a final celebration of the Agera range and as the last models to wear the Agera badge. The cars could be fully customised and combined with the Agera RS chassis with the One:1 engine. The first car to be unveiled was called the 'One of One'. It featured a unique orange paint scheme with bare carbon and blue accents. The exterior of the car was complemented with a large adjustable rear wing similar to the One:1 and triple front canards along with a large front splitter.

The other two distinct final edition cars were unveiled online in July 2018 and were called 'Agera FE Thor' and 'Agera FE Väder' respectively. Thor features a custom two-tone black paintwork consisting of crushed diamonds and white accents. The exterior features a large rear wing reminiscent of that found on the Agera XS, and a different set of front canards, along with a large front splitter and a Le Mans-style central fin for improved downforce, setting it apart from the rest of the Agera models. Väder features the same crushed diamond paintwork with a bare carbon fibre centre along with white accents, incorporating the same rear wing as Thor but excludes the central fin. Both cars made their public appearance at the 2018 Goodwood Festival of Speed.

Special editions
There have been many special editions of the Agera built on customer request. Such special editions include:

Technical data

World records
World records set on 8 June 2015 with a Koenigsegg One:1

On 1 October 2017, the Agera RS made the  record in 36.44 seconds, 5.56 seconds faster than the record made by the Bugatti Chiron. The record was achieved on an old Danish airbase in Vandel, Denmark. The car was driven by Koenigsegg test driver Niklas Lilja. Koenigsegg mentioned that during the record run, the car accelerated from 0–400 km/h in 26.88 seconds over a distance of 1,958 metres and decelerated in 9.56 seconds over a distance of 483 metres. The total distance used for the record was 2,441 metres. During the speed record run on 4 November 2017, Koenigsegg also broke their previous 0–400–0 km/h record by 2.57 seconds. However, the record was broken by a Koenigsegg Regera − which completed the run in 31.49 seconds on 23 September 2019.

The car achieved a speed of  during its northbound run and  during its southbound (return run). Official confirmation of the record by Guinness World Records still awaits. The car was driven by Koenigsegg test driver Niklas Lilja. The record run was made in opposite directions on an  section of Nevada State Route 160 between Las Vegas and Pahrump in the United States which was closed specifically for that purpose.

Successor 
The successor of the Agera called the Jesko was unveiled at the 2019 Geneva Motor Show. The potential replacement was shown to prospective buyers via VR in an event held in Australia by the company beforehand.

See also 

 List of production cars by power output

References

External links

 

Agera
Rear mid-engine, rear-wheel-drive vehicles
Sports cars
Cars introduced in 2011
Flagship vehicles